is a professional Japanese basketball coach and former player.

Head coaching record

|- 
| style="text-align:left;"|Toshiba
| style="text-align:left;"|2011-12
| 42||8||34|||| style="text-align:center;"| 8th|||-||-||-||
| style="text-align:center;"|-
|-
| style="text-align:left;"|Toshiba
| style="text-align:left;"|2012-13
| 42||29||13|||| style="text-align:center;"|3rd|||8||4||4||
| style="text-align:center;"|Runners-up
|-
|- style="background:#FDE910;"
| style="text-align:left;"|Toshiba
| style="text-align:left;"|2013-14
| 54||46||8|||| style="text-align:center;"|1st in Eastern|||5||5||0||
| style="text-align:center;"|NBL Champions
|-
| style="text-align:left;"|Toshiba
| style="text-align:left;"|2014-15
| 54||38||16|||| style="text-align:center;"|4th in Eastern|||2||0||2||
| style="text-align:center;"|Lost in 1st round
|-
|- style="background:#FDE910;"
| style="text-align:left;"|Toshiba
| style="text-align:left;"|2015-16
| 54||37||17|||| style="text-align:center;"|3rd|||10||7||3||
| style="text-align:center;"|NBL Champions
|-
| style="text-align:left;"|Kawasaki
| style="text-align:left;"|2016-17
| 60||49||11|||| style="text-align:center;"|1st in Central|||6||4||2||
| style="text-align:center;"|Runners-up
|-
| style="text-align:left;"|Kawasaki
| style="text-align:left;"|2017-18
| 60||41||19|||| style="text-align:center;"|3rd in Eastern|||3||1||2||
| style="text-align:center;"|Lost in 1st round
|-
| style="text-align:left;"|Kawasaki
| style="text-align:left;"|2018-19
| 60||40||20|||| style="text-align:center;"|2nd in Central |||2||0||2||
| style="text-align:center;"|Lost in 1st round
|-

References

1972 births
Living people
Japanese basketball coaches
Japanese men's basketball players
Place of birth missing (living people)
Toshiba Kawasaki Brave Thunders coaches
Kawasaki Brave Thunders players
Basketball players at the 2002 Asian Games
Universiade medalists in basketball
Universiade silver medalists for Japan
Asian Games competitors for Japan
Medalists at the 1995 Summer Universiade